Sebba Airport  is an airport serving the village of Sebba in the Yagha Province, part of the Sahel Region of Burkina Faso.

The runway is unmarked and its length is estimated.

See also
List of airports in Burkina Faso

References

External links 
 Airport record for Sebba Airport at Landings.com

Airports in Burkina Faso
Yagha Province